Braddock is a borough located in the eastern suburbs of Pittsburgh in Allegheny County, Pennsylvania, United States,  upstream from the mouth of the Monongahela River. The population was 1,721 as of the 2020 census, a 91.8% decline since its peak of 20,879 in 1920.

History

Braddock is named for General Edward Braddock (1695–1755), commander of American colonial forces at the start of the French and Indian War. The Braddock Expedition to capture Fort Duquesne (modern day Pittsburgh) from the French led to the British general's own fatal wounding and a sound defeat of his troops after crossing the Monongahela River on July 9, 1755. This battle, now called the Battle of the Monongahela, was a key event at the beginning of the French and Indian War.

The area surrounding Braddock's Field was originally inhabited by the Lenape, ruled by Queen Alliquippa. In 1742, John Fraser and his family established the area at the mouth of Turtle Creek as the first permanent English settlement west of the Allegheny Mountains. George Washington visited the area in 1753-1754. It was the site of Braddock's Defeat on July 9, 1755.

Braddock's first industrial facility, a barrel plant, opened in 1850. The borough was incorporated on June 8, 1867. The town's industrial economy began in 1873, when Andrew Carnegie built the Edgar Thomson Steel Works on the historic site of Braddock's Field in what is now North Braddock, Pennsylvania. This was one of the first American steel mills which used the Bessemer process. As of 2010, it continues operation as a part of the United States Steel Corporation. This era of the town's history is depicted in Thomas Bell's novel Out of This Furnace.

Braddock is also the location of the first of Andrew Carnegie's 1,679 (some sources list 1,689) public libraries in the US, designed by William Halsey Wood of Newark, New Jersey, and dedicated on March 30, 1889. The Braddock Library included a tunnel entrance for Carnegie's millworkers to enter a bathhouse in the basement to clean up before entering the facilities (which originally included billiard tables). An addition in 1893, by Longfellow, Alden and Harlow (Boston & Pittsburgh, successors to Henry Hobson Richardson), added a swimming pool, indoor basketball court, and 964-seat music hall that included a Votey pipe organ. The building was rescued from demolition in 1978 by the Braddock's Field Historical Society, and is still in use as a public library. The bathhouse has recently been converted to a pottery studio; the music hall is currently under restoration.

During the early 1900s many immigrants settled in Braddock, primarily from Croatia, Slovenia, and Hungary.

Braddock lost its importance with the collapse of the steel industry in the United States in the 1970s and 1980s. This coincided with the crack cocaine epidemic of the early 1980s, and the combination of the two woes nearly destroyed the community. In 1988, Braddock was designated a financially distressed municipality. The entire water distribution system was rebuilt in 1990-1991 at a cost of $4.7 million, resulting in a fine system where only 5% of piped water is deemed "unaccounted-for". From its peak in the 1920s, Braddock has since lost 90% of its population.

John Fetterman, mayor of Braddock from 2006 until his 2019 inauguration as Lieutenant Governor of Pennsylvania, launched a campaign to attract new residents to the area from the artistic and creative communities. He also initiated various revitalization efforts, including the nonprofit organization Braddock Redux. Fetterman appeared in various media to discuss his vision of Braddock's needs, including PBS, The Colbert Report on Comedy Central, CNN, Fox News, CNBC, and The New York Times. In the UK, The Guardian and the BBC have reported on him. He has also had his own episode on Hulu's original series A Day in the Life. John Fetterman has went on to become one of the two United States Senators from Pennsylvania after a tough election in the 2022 midterms. 

Since 1974, Braddock resident Tony Buba has made many films. One of his earlier films is Justice League centering on the borough and its industrial decline, including Struggles in Steel. In September 2010, the IFC and Sundance television channels showed the film Ready to Work: Portraits of Braddock, produced by the Levi Strauss corporation. This film interviews many of the local residents and shows their efforts to revitalize the town.

Geography

Surrounding and adjacent neighborhoods
Braddock has two land borders, with North Braddock from the north to the southeast, and Rankin to the northwest.  Across the Monongahela River to the south, Braddock is adjacent to Whitaker and West Mifflin.

Demographics

2020 census

Note: the US Census treats Hispanic/Latino as an ethnic category. This table excludes Latinos from the racial categories and assigns them to a separate category. Hispanics/Latinos can be of any race.

According to the American Community Survey in 2020, Braddock has an employment rate of 34.2%, a median household income of $23,050, 3.7% of the population has no health care coverage, with 10.7% of the population possessing a Bachelor's degree or higher.

Government and politics

Education
Woodland Hills School District is the local school district.

In popular culture
A&P's first supermarket opened in Braddock in 1936.
George A. Romero's 1978 horror film Martin takes place in Braddock and was largely filmed there.
Parts of the 1996 TV film The Christmas Tree, Sally Field's TV directorial debut, were shot in the Braddock Carnegie Library
'Voices at Whisper Bend' (1999), a historical mystery from American Girl (book series), took place in Braddock.
Levi Strauss & Co., the maker of Levi's jeans, chose the borough for its "youth" commercial campaign, which was televised in late 2010 and 2011.
The 2010 film One for the Money used the shuttered University of Pittsburgh Medical Center facility in Braddock as the "Trenton Police Headquarters".
Thomas Bell's historical novel Out of This Furnace is set in Braddock during the 1890s to the 1930s.
Out of the Furnace, a film starring Christian Bale released in 2013, was shot in Braddock.
Helen Campbell's novel Turnip Blues, detailing the lives of Depression-era immigrants, is set in Braddock.
 Episode 1 of OtherLife is set there.
 Episode 1 of the TV series Mindhunter is set in Braddock.

Notable people
Thomas Bell – novelist; set Out of This Furnace in Braddock
Tony Buba – filmmaker
John Clayton – sportswriter and NFL analyst
Henry Clay Drexler – recipient of the Navy Cross and Medal of Honor
Matthew A. Dunn – former member of the United States House of Representatives
John Fetterman – former mayor of Braddock, former Lieutenant Governor of Pennsylvania, and United States Senator from Pennsylvania
Gisele Barreto Fetterman – former Second Lady of Pennsylvania
LaToya Ruby Frazier – artist; 2015 MacArthur Fellow
James Samuel Gallagher – former member of the Wisconsin State Assembly
Joseph M. Gaydos – former member of the United States House of Representatives
Vernon Irvin – Chief Marketing Officer for XM Satellite Radio
Captain Bill Jones – first superintendent of the Edgar Thompson Works under Andrew Carnegie
Melville Kelly – former member of the United States House of Representatives; established the Braddock Leader newspaper
Billy Knight – former Pittsburgh Panther and NBA player and executive
Sean Lomax – professional whistler
John Maisto – former ambassador to Venezuela, Nicaragua, and the Organization of American States
Tom Major-Ball - music hall performer and father of British Prime Minister John Major
Joseph A. McDonald – steel industry executive
Art Pallan – radio celebrity
George Peppard – lived and worked in Braddock as a radio announcer in his early career
James L. Quinn – former member of the United States House of Representatives
Frank S. Scott – first enlisted member of the United States armed forces to lose his life in an aircraft accident
Lauren Tewes – actress best known for playing Cruise Director Julie McCoy on The Love Boat

See also
 Braddock's Battlefield History Center

References

External links

2005 Pittsburgh City Paper feature story about Braddock including history, interviews with residents and a controversial highway project
Pittsburgh City Paper feature story about Braddock's urban decay, and the recent influx of artists drawn to the city by mayor John Fetterman
New York Times: "Braddock, Pa: Rock Bottom for Decades, but Showing Signs of Life"
Article in the UK's Guardian newspaper about mayor John Fetterman
The Battle of the Monongahela, which took place in Braddock in 1755

1867 establishments in Pennsylvania
Boroughs in Allegheny County, Pennsylvania
Company towns in Pennsylvania
Pennsylvania populated places on the Monongahela River
Pittsburgh metropolitan area
Populated places established in 1742